The 1993 AXA Equity & Law League was the twenty-fifth competing of English cricket's Sunday League.  The competition was won for the first time by Glamorgan County Cricket Club.

The season

The season's competition had a number of changes. This was the first season to be sponsored by AXA (Equity and Law). The overs went up from 40 per side to 50, the teams would play with a white ball and dark sightscreens and each team would be wearing their own coloured clothing.

The season came down to a nail-biting finish with Kent and Glamorgan tied on points going into the final round of matches. These teams were scheduled to play one another on the last day of the season at the St Lawrence Ground, Canterbury in a televised match. Glamorgan beat Kent by six wickets to win the league. This match was Glamorgan and West Indies batsman Viv Richards's final one day match and fittingly he was at the crease when the winning runs were scored.

Standings

Batting averages

Bowling averages

See also
Sunday League

References

AXA
Pro40